Juan Carlos Ablanedo Iglesias (born 2 September 1963) is a Spanish former footballer who played as a goalkeeper.

Due to his above-average reflexes he was nicknamed El gato (cat), and represented local Sporting de Gijón for almost 20 years as a professional.

Club career
Ablanedo was born in Mieres, Asturias. During his career he played solely for Sporting de Gijón after being a product of the club's famed youth system, Mareo, and received his first-team debut on 2 January 1983, as a second-half substitute in a 1–0 home win against RCD Español after José Aurelio Rivero was sent off.

After two further appearances the following season, Ablanedo became the Asturian side's undisputed starter, totalling 399 La Liga appearances. In the 1986–87 campaign, as Sporting finished fourth, he appeared in 42 matches (out of 44, as the league had a second stage).

Ablanedo retired from football after 1998–99, with Sporting now in the Segunda División. He also had some serious injuries during his career, playing only two games in his last season and none in 1991–92. He was awarded three Ricardo Zamora Trophy awards during his career.

International career
Ablanedo earned four caps for Spain, the first coming on 24 September 1986 in a 3–1 friendly victory over Greece in Gijón. He was a backup in both the 1986 and 1990 FIFA World Cups.

Previously, Ablanedo helped the nation's under-21s conquer the 1986 European Championship.

Personal life
Ablanedo's older brother, José Luis, was also a footballer. A defender, he too played several top-tier seasons with Sporting, and they were hence known as Ablanedo I and Ablanedo II.

Honours
Spain U21
UEFA European Under-21 Championship: 1986

Individual
Ricardo Zamora Trophy: 1984–85, 1985–86, 1989–90

See also
List of one-club men

Notes

References

External links

1963 births
Living people
Spanish footballers
Footballers from Mieres, Asturias
Association football goalkeepers
La Liga players
Segunda División players
Segunda División B players
Sporting de Gijón B players
Sporting de Gijón players
Spain youth international footballers
Spain under-21 international footballers
Spain under-23 international footballers
Spain international footballers
1986 FIFA World Cup players
1990 FIFA World Cup players